Parotodus, commonly known as the false-toothed mako shark (or false mako shark), is an extinct genus of mackerel shark that lived approximately 53 to one million years ago during the Eocene and Pleistocene epochs. 
Its teeth, which are found worldwide, are often prized by fossil collectors due to their rarity. The scarcity of fossils is because Parotodus likely primarily inhabited open oceans far away from the continents.

Description
Initially appearing as a small shark, Parotodus gradually increased in size over geologic time and by the Neogene period became one of the largest sharks of its time. The teeth of Parotodus are distinctively curved and rarely show feeding damage, which suggests that it mainly preyed on soft-bodied animals. Paleontologists speculate that this included other sharks, including the contemporaneous Megalodon.

Classification
Due to the general scarcity and ambiguity of fossils, the familiar placement remains uncertain. Several proposals suggest classifying the genus as a mega-toothed shark, cardabiodont, archaeolamnid, thresher shark, or white shark.

Currently, three valid species are generally recognized within Parotodus. These include P. benedenii, P. pavlovi, and P. mangyshlakensis. However, some scientists, especially those who identify Parotodus as a cardabiodont, do not recognize the latter two as members of the genus.

A fourth species was reported by Ward, Nakatani, and Bernard in a 2017 poster from the Oligocene of Japan. The poster stated that the new species is to be named after Yasuhiro Fudouji, the paleontologist who discovered the type specimens, and will be formally described in an upcoming paper. However, the scientific name was not explicitly stated to avoid an accidental invalidation of the taxon.

Fossil records

The genus is often regarded as a rare species despite its presence in ocean deposits worldwide. As a result, it is often prized by fossil collectors. Paleontologists believe that Parotodus likely inhabited primarily open oceans like the modern oceanic whitetip shark and blue shark. This would explain why fossils of a cosmopolitan animal are so rare, given that open oceans are seldom represented in terrestrial fossil deposits. This hypothesis is additionally supported by how Parotodus teeth are unusually common in nodule deposits under the Pacific and Indian Oceans and on islands located far away from continental lands.

Parotodus fossils have been recovered from fossil deposits in the Azores, Mallorca, Malta, Europe, Madagascar, Kazakhstan, Japan, South Korea, South Africa, New Zealand, Australia, Peru, California, the East Coast of the United States, and dredged from the Pacific and Indian Oceans.

References

See also
 List of prehistoric cartilaginous fish

Neogene fish of Europe
Lamnidae
Pliocene sharks